This is an incomplete list of ambassadors from France to Russia.

Eighteenth century 

1702-1713 
1713 Lavie (Levisson)
1721 de Campredon
1727-1733 Magnan
1734 Édouard Salomon Fonton de l'Etang-la-Ville
1739-1743 Jacques-Joachim Trotti, marquis de La Chétardie
1742-1748 Louis d'Usson de Bonnac, comte d'Alion (1743-1747 de Saint-Sauveur (consul))
1755 chevalier Douglas
1757 Paul-Gallucio, marquis de L'Hospital
1760-1764 Louis Auguste Le Tonnelier de Breteuil
1772-1774 
1774 Charles-Louis Le Clerc, marquis de Juigné
1782-1784 Charles Olivier de Saint-Georges de Vérac
1785-1789 Louis Philippe de Ségur
1790-1791 
1789-1792 Edmond-Charles Genêt

Nineteenth century and early twentieth century  

 1792-1812 Barthélemy de Lesseps
 1801-1804 Gabriel, comte d'Hédouville
 1807 Anne Jean Marie René Savary
 1807-1811 Armand Caulaincourt
 1811-1812 Jacques Alexandre Law de Lauriston
 1814-1819 Achille Charles Victor de Noailles
 1820-1827 Auguste, comte de La Ferronays
 1828-1830 Casimir Louis Victurnien de Rochechouart de Mortemart
 1830 - 1831: Édouard Adolphe Casimir Joseph Mortier
 1832 prince de Trévise
 1832 - 1835: Nicolas Joseph Maison
 1835-1848 Prosper Brugière de Barante
 1849-1849 Adolphe Emmanuel Charles Le Flô (persona non grata in 1851)
 1849-1849 Christophe Louis Léon Juchault de Lamoricière, ambassadeur extraordinaire
 1849-1854 Général de Castelbajac
 1856-1857 Charles, duc de Morny, ambassadeur extraordinaire
 1857-1858 Alphonse de Rayneval
 1858-1864 Louis Napoléon Lannes
 1864-1869 Charles de Talleyrand-Périgord
 1869-1870 
 1870-1879 Adolphe Emmanuel Charles Le Flô
 1879-1882 Antoine Chanzy
 1882-1883 Benjamin Jaurès
 1883-1886 
 1886-1891 Paul Lefebvre de Laboulaye
 1891-1902 
 1902-1908 Maurice Bompard
 1908-1913 Georges Louis
 1913-1914 Théophile Delcassé
 1914-1917 Maurice Paléologue
 1917-?    M. Doulet (Chargé d'Affaires)
 1917-1920? Joseph Noulens

Soviet Union 
1924-1932 Jean Herbette
1933-1936 Charles Alphand
1936-1939 Robert Coulondre
1939-1940 Paul-Émile Naggiar
1940-1941 
1941-1941 
Official end to the diplomatic relations between the Soviet Union and the Vichy Government following the latter's support of the German Operation Barbarossa
During the war the French National Committee was represented in the Soviet Union by Roger Garreau
1945-1948 Georges Catroux
1948-1952 Yves Chataigneau
1952-1955 Louis Joxe
1955-1964 
1964-1966 Philippe Baudet
1966-1968 
1968-1973 Roger Seydoux
1973-1976 Jacques Vimont
1976-1979 Bruno de Leusse
1979-1981 Henri Froment-Meurice
1981-1984 Claude Arnaud
1985-1986 Jean-Bernard Raimond
1986-1988 Yves Pagniez
1989-1991 
1991-1992

Post-Soviet Russia 

1991-1992 
1992-1996 
1996-2000 Hubert Colin de Verdière
2002-2003 Claude-Marie Blanchemaison
2003-2006 Jean Cadet
2006-2009 Stanislas Lefebvre de Laboulaye
2009-2013 Jean de Gliniasty
2013-2017 Jean-Maurice Ripert
2017-2019 Sylvie Bermann
2020–Present

References 

Russia
France